Nueltin Lake Airport  is located near to Nueltin Lake, Manitoba, Canada.

References

Registered aerodromes in Manitoba